Diego Menchaca González-Quintanilla (born 20 October 1994 in Mexico City) is a Mexican racing driver.

Career

Karting
Menchaca began karting in 2006 at the age of eight, competing in championships across Mexico and the United States.

Lower Formulae
In 2011, Menchaca graduated to single-seaters in the LATAM Challenge Series. There he took a pole position at the round in Houston and finished fourth in the overall standings.

For the next two years, Menchaca raced with Fortec Motorsports and Jamun Racing Services in the British Formula Renault Championship, where he finished eleventh in 2012 and eighteenth the following year.

In 2014, Menchaca switched to BRDC Formula 4 with Douglas Motorsport. He claimed a victory in the third race at Donington Park and finished seventh in the overall standings.

In 2015, Menchaca joined Campos Racing for the Euroformula Open Championship, where he finished eighth in the Euroformula standings and sixth in the Spanish F3 standings. He remained with Campos for the following season, finishing fourth and fifth in the respective championship standings.

Formula V8 3.5
In December 2016, Menchaca partook in the post-season collective Test with Teo Martín Motorsport.

Racing record

Career summary

Complete World Series Formula V8 3.5 results
(key) (Races in bold indicate pole position; races in italics indicate fastest lap)

Complete GP3 Series results
(key) (Races in bold indicate pole position) (Races in italics indicate fastest lap)

Complete Blancpain GT World Challenge Europe results
(key) (Races in bold indicate pole position) (Races in italics indicate fastest lap)

Complete European Le Mans Series results
(key) (Races in bold indicate pole position; results in italics indicate fastest lap)

References

External links
 

1994 births
Living people
Racing drivers from Mexico City
Mexican racing drivers
Euroformula Open Championship drivers
World Series Formula V8 3.5 drivers
Mexican GP3 Series drivers
LATAM Challenge Series drivers
Formula Renault BARC drivers
Blancpain Endurance Series drivers
European Le Mans Series drivers
Campos Racing drivers
W Racing Team drivers
Fortec Motorsport drivers
24H Series drivers